Roberta Lynn DeBiasi is head of the Division of Pediatric Diseases and Co-Director of the Congenital Zika Program at Children's National Hospital in Washington D.C. She is also principal investigator at the Center for Translational Research at Children's National Research Institute and professor of pediatrics and microbiology, immunology and tropical medicine at George Washington University School of Medicine & Health Sciences.

An alumna of Boston University (1988),  she earned an M.D. from University of Virginia School of Medicine (1992).

References

External links 
 Publications on PubMed
 Washington Journal:  Dr. Roberta DeBiasi on Coronavirus and Children (C-SPAN, August 3, 2020)

Women pediatricians
Physicians of the Children's National Hospital
Boston University alumni
University of Virginia School of Medicine alumni
Living people
Year of birth missing (living people)

American medical researchers
American medical academics